Try Harder! is a 2021 American documentary film, directed and produced by Debbie Lum. It follows students at Lowell High School as they apply and hope for admission to the college of their dreams.

It had its world premiere at the Sundance Film Festival on January 30, 2021. It was released on December 3, 2021, by Greenwich Entertainment.

Synopsis
Students at Lowell High School apply and hope for admission to the college of their dreams.

Release
The film had its world premiere at the Sundance Film Festival on January 30, 2021. It also screened at the Full Frame Documentary Film Festival on June 2, 2021. It also screened at AFI Docs in June 2021. In August 2021, Greenwich Entertainment acquired distribution rights to the film. It was released on December 3, 2021. The film also aired on Independent Lens on PBS on May 2, 2022.

Reception

Box office
In its opening weekend, the film earned $27,815 from 5 theaters.

Critical response
Try Harder received positive reviews from film critics.

References

External links
 
 

2021 films
2021 documentary films
American documentary films
Documentary films about high school
Documentary films about high school in the United States
PBS original programming
2020s English-language films
2020s American films